is a 2003 album by GO!GO!7188. The title translates as mane in English.

Track listing

Notes and references 

GO!GO!7188 albums
2003 albums